Zelyonaya Griva is a rural locality (a village) in Vakhnevskoye Rural Settlement, Nikolsky District, Vologda Oblast, Russia. The population was 25 as of 2002.

Geography 
Zelyonaya Griva is located 62 km northwest of Nikolsk (the district's administrative centre) by road. Kolesov Log is the nearest rural locality.

References 

Rural localities in Nikolsky District, Vologda Oblast